Daisan may refer to:
 Daišan, Manchu prince
 Daisan River, a river of Turkey